The Benidorm International Song Festival, until 2004 simply Benidorm Song Festival, was an annual song contest held in the city of Benidorm, Spain. The contest, based on the Italian Sanremo Music Festival, was created to promote Benidorm and Spanish music.

It originally ran from 1959 to 2006 (except in 1979, 1984 and from 1986 to 1992, when it was not held) and used to take place in the summer.

The festival has undergone considerable modifications over the years, for example in the prizes. In 2004, it went from national to international. The contest was usually broadcast on television by REM (1959), TVE (1960–1985, 1997–2005), Telecinco (1993–1996) or Canal Nou (1997–2006).

History
In 1958, the idea of holding a Spanish summer song festival like what had been done in Sanremo, Italy, since 1951 (Sanremo Music Festival) came up. This event took place in the Benidorm kiosk El Tío Quico, where the mayor of the city, Pedro Zaragoza, the writer and journalist Carlos Villacorta, director of the press office of the General Secretariat of the Movement, and the journalist  were present.

The mechanics of the festival during the first editions (from 1959 to 1971) consisted of presenting the songs in double versions, as was usual in the song festivals of the moment, including Sanremo. The victory of the song "Un telegrama" and its huge success in Spain at the time guaranteed the continuity of the festival in Benidorm, despite the fact that some cities in the south of Spain tried to take over the organisation of the festival. During this period, the greatest hits in the history of the festival took place, such as "Comunicando", "Quisiera ser", "Tu loca juventud", "La vida sigue igual" and "Amor amargo". It also featured the participation of emerging personalities of Spanish light song, such as Dúo Dinámico, Raphael, Bruno Lomas, Joe y Luis, Michel, Los Gritos and Julio Iglesias. In addition, although it was not their catapult to success, during these years artists such as Karina, Víctor Manuel, Lolita Garrido and Manolo Otero performed. Also, Rosa Morena, who was already enjoying success abroad before her consecration in Spain, participated.

On the other hand, the period between 1972 and 1985 marked a certain decline of the festival. The press repeated year after year that the quality of the songs was descending and in fact, during these years, the festival only released the hit "Soledad", by Emilio José and awarded prizes to soloists such as Eduardo Rodrigo, Mochi, Juan Camacho or Dyango and composers such as Juan Pardo, Dúo Dinámico or El Lute. Other contenders were Betty Missiego, Braulio, Tito Mora, José Vélez, the actress Beatriz Carvajal, Nydia Caro, Andrés Caparrós, José María Bacchelli or Tino Casal. The changes in the musical and audiovisual panorama brought about by the political transition led to a growing lack of interest in the festival. The non celebration of the 1979 and 1984 editions and experimental editions in 1983 (non-competitive) and 1985 (which searched for a younger audience, inviting pop-rock groups such as Alphaville, Seguridad Social or Aerolíneas Federales) failed to raise the interest of the public, which led to the cancellation of the festival from 1986 to 1992.

After a break of seven consecutive years, the contest was held again in 1993, beginning its third phase. In that first year, two categories were differentiated, the pop-rock final and the light song final, but from 1994 onwards, the old formula of awarding prizes to a single song was reinstated. The event became international in 2004, adopting the name of Festival Internacional de la Canción de Benidorm (Benidorm International Song Festival), and ceased to be held after its 39th edition (held in 2006) due to the lack of interest from the public and the media. During these 14 editions, the media repercussion of the festival was null, despite awarding the first prize to Alazán, Coral Segovia and La Década Prodigiosa and the authors Pablo Motos and Rosana Arbelo. Other relevant artists of the Spanish music scene who performed at this stage were Esmeralda Grao, Paco Arrojo, Pasión Vega, Luis Livingstone, Mikel Herzog, A las 10 en casa, Barei (as part of the duo Dos Puntos), Jesús Cisneros and Inma Serrano.

The festival used to be broadcast by TVE, although during the 1960s and 1970s it was not broadcast entirely because it was a show designed mainly for the public gathered in Benidorm, not as much as a television programme. The editions from 1993 to 1996 were broadcast by Telecinco and from 1997, the broadcasting returned to TVE and the regional channel Canal Nou. The 2006 edition did not have national television coverage as TVE dissociated itself from the project and was only broadcast by Canal Nou.

Golden Mermaid Trophy winners 
As of 2006, the first prize winner was awarded with the Golden Mermaid Trophy (Sirenita de Oro) and €36,000 (about US$47,000) to produce a record. Second and third place winners received the Silver Mermaid Trophy (Sirenita de Plata) and the Bronze Mermaid Trophy (Sirenita de Bronce), respectively.

Notes

References

External links 
 Benidorm, Overview with video of the city. From a local citizen.

Spanish culture
Valencian culture
Song contests
Music festivals established in 1959
Benidorm